Zuwarah, or Zuwara or Zwara (Berber language: At Willul or Zwara) is a coastal Berber-speaking city in Libya.

Zuwara or At Willul is famous for its beaches and seafood. It is the capital of the Nuqat al Khams district. Its population speaks Zuwara Berber, a Zenati Berber language. Zuwarah consists of 49 districts.

History
The settlement was first mentioned by the traveller Abdallah al-Tijani in the years 1306-1309 as Zwara al-saghirah ("Little Zwarah").  In the Catalan Atlas (1375) it was called as Punta dar Zoyara.  The town is mentioned by Leo Africanus in the 16th century.  It later served as the western outpost of Italian Libya (1912–43), being the terminus of the now-defunct Italian Libya Railway from Tripoli  to the east. Its artificial harbour shelters a motorized fishing fleet. Cereals, dates, and esparto grass (used to make cordage, shoes, and paper) are local products.

It was in 1973 in Zuwara that Muammar Gaddafi first proclaimed the Libyan "Cultural Revolution".

2011 Libyan civil war

During the 2011 Libyan Civil War, the city was reported by Al Jazeera to be under control of the local anti-Gaddafi forces on 23 February 2011, and lost by the government of Muammar Gaddafi. Thousands of anti-government protesters, gathered in the Zuwara town square on 24 February, repulsed another Libyan Army attempt to retake the city. Loyalist forces used the pro-government towns of Jumayl and Riqdalin to the south as bases for their attacks on the city. However, from March onwards, the city was under the control of loyalist forces. Amidst the August rebel coastal offensive, rebels took Zuwara on 18 August.

In September 2011, and following the fall of the Gaddafi government, Zuwara was the first City in Libya to democratically elect its local council.

Climate
Zuwara has a hot semi-arid climate (Köppen climate classification BSh).

See also
 List of cities in Libya
 Zuwara Berber
Dania Ben Sassi

References

Sources
 Terence Frederick Mitchell, Ferhat. An Everyday Story of Berber Folk in and around Zuara (Libya), Köln, Köppe, 2007 -

External links
Official Zuwara Municipality website - in Tamazight and Arabic
official Zuwara website - in Arabic

Populated places in Nuqat al Khams District
Port cities and towns in Libya
Tripolitania
Baladiyat of Libya
Berber populated places